Deividas Dulkys (born 12 March 1988) is a Lithuanian former professional basketball player currently working as an assistant coach for the Memphis Hustle of the NBA G League. He played as a swingman.

College career
Dulkys moved to the U.S. in 2005 to attend high school in the hopes of obtaining a college scholarship. He first attended Liberty Christian Academy in Lynchburg, Virginia before moving to Findlay College Prep in Henderson, Nevada, participating in their 32–1 record during his senior year (the loss in the National Prep school championship game).

During his time in Nevada he also played for the Branch West All-Star AAU.

He committed to Florida State University of the Atlantic Coast Conference of NCAA Division I in April 2007 amidst interest from Oregon and California.

With Florida State he played 131 career games (2nd best for FSU) as they reached the NCAA tournament in every of his 4 years in Florida, reaching the Sweet Sixteen in 2011.
He was part of the first Seminoles team to win the ACC tournament during his senior season in 2012, Dulkys finished his collegiate career with 203 three-point shots made, including a FSU record 8 against #3 ranked North Carolina on ESPN College GameDay on 14 January 2012.

Professional career
Going undrafted in the 2012 NBA draft, the Lithuanian returned home to join LKL and VTB United League side Lietuvos rytas Vilnius in July 2012, signing a multi-year contract.

He started the season with the Lithuanian giants, playing in Europe's top tier EuroLeague, before they loaned him to Latvian team Barons Riga for the second part of the season in order to gain more playing time, having played American basketball for more years he struggled re-adapting during his first year back in Europe.

For the 2013–14 season he was loaned from the start of the season to Polish side Anwil Włocławek of the, Tauron Basket Liga, he played well in Poland, being named best player in the TBL February 2014, earning a call-up to the All Star Game against Czech League players the same month.

Dulkys left the Polish side a few days later, being re-loaned by Lietuvos rytas Vilnius to Turkish outfit Tofaş for the remainder of the season after they bought out Anwil's contract with the player, the latter agreeing to lose a mayor player for financial reasons. He scored 11.4 points on 54.5 percent from 3-point range in 10 games, as Tofaş made it to the Turkish Basketball League quarter-finals.

After his two-year contract was seemingly not extended by Lietuvos rytas Vilnius, he joined Italian Serie A team Umana Reyer Venezia in July 2014.

On 19 June 2015, he signed with Yeşilgiresun Belediye of the Turkish Basketball League for the 2015–16 season.

On 11 October 2016, Dulkys signed with Rio Natura Monbus Obradoiro. Following the solid season in Liga ACB where he averaged 10.3 points, 2.5 rebounds and 2.6 assists, he joined the Golden State Warriors for the 2017 NBA Summer League.

In August 2017, Dulkys signed with İstanbul BB. He averaged 6.5 points, 2.3 rebounds and 2.5 assists per game in four games, a season shortened due to injury. On 4 August 2018, Dulkys signed with the Polish club Asseco Gdynia.

On 13 September 2019, he has signed with Baxi Manresa of the Liga ACB. Dulkys signed an extension with Manresa on 24 December.

On 13 November 2020, Dulkys returned to Manresa.

Coaching career
On 23 October 2021, Dulkys became an assistant coach for the Memphis Hustle.

National team career
Fresh out of college Dulkys played for Lithuania in 2012 Olympic qualification, he finished with a solitary three-pointer scored in 6 minutes spread across 3 games.
He was not selected for the Olympics proper and has not played for Lithuania since 2012.

Personal life
He is married to McCall Maynor, an American that he met whilst they were both studying at Florida State University. She has followed him around the world for his career whilst managing her own online boutique that creates clothing and accessories.

References

External links
Deividas Dulkys at acb.com 
 "Deividas Dulkys at", FIBA Game Center. Retrieved on 25 May 2015.
"Deividas Dulkys at", Lega Basket. Retrieved on 25 May 2015.
 "Deividas Dulkys at", Eurobasket.com. Retrieved on 23 May 2015.
 "Deividas Dulkys at", RealGM. Retrieved on 23 May 2015.
 "Deividas Dulkys at", DraftExpress (Commercial website). Retrieved on 24 May 2015.
 "Deividas Dulkys at", Polish Basketball League. Retrieved on 24 May 2015.
 "Deividas Dulkys at", Turkish Basketball League stats

1988 births
Living people
Asseco Gdynia players
Bàsquet Manresa players
BC Rytas players
BK Barons players
Florida State Seminoles men's basketball players
İstanbul Büyükşehir Belediyespor basketball players
KK Włocławek players
Lega Basket Serie A players
Liga ACB players
Lithuanian expatriate basketball people in Italy
Lithuanian expatriate basketball people in Latvia
Lithuanian expatriate basketball people in Poland
Lithuanian expatriate basketball people in Spain
Lithuanian expatriate basketball people in Turkey
Lithuanian expatriate basketball people in the United States
Lithuanian men's basketball players
Obradoiro CAB players
People from Šilutė
Reyer Venezia players
Shooting guards
Small forwards
Tofaş S.K. players
Yeşilgiresun Belediye players